The 2017 Golden Globes (Portugal) was held on 21 May 2017 and broadcast by SIC and presented by João Manzarra.

Winners and nominees

Cinema

Best Film: 
Cartas da Guerra - Ivo M. Ferreira
 John From - João Nicolau
 Cinzento e Negro - Luís Filipe Rocha
 O Ornitólogo - João Pedro Rodrigues

Best Actor:
Nuno Lopes - Posto Avançado de Progresso
Miguel Nunes - Cartas da Guerra
Miguel Borges - Cinzento e Negro
Filipe Duarte - Cinzento e Negro

Best Actress: 
Ana Padrão - Jogo de Damas
Mónica Calle - Cinzento e Negro
Joana Bárcia - Cinzento e Negro
Maria João Abreu - A Mãe é que Sabe

Theatre

Best Play:   
Música - Luís Miguel Cintra
Moçambique  - Jorge Andrade
O Impromptu de Versalhes - Miguel Loureiro
Pinocchio - Bruno Bravo

Best Actor:
João Perry - O Pai
João Pedro Mamede - Jardim Zoológico de Vidro
Pedro Almendra  - Os Últimos Dias da Humanidade
Rúben Gomes  - O Rio

Best Actress: 
Isabel Abreu - Um Diário de Preces
Beatriz Batarda - As Criadas
Luísa Cruz - Música
Rita Cabaço  -  Música

Fashion

Best Stylist:  
Luís Carvalho
Nuno Gama
Dino Alves
Carlos Gil
   
Best Male Model:
Francisco Henriques - Central Models
Luís Borges - Central Models
Fernando Cabral - Karacter Agency 
Fábio Tavares - Face Models

Best Female Model: 
Maria Clara - L'Agence
Sara Sampaio - Central Models
Marianne Bittencourt - Karacter Agency
Isilda - Central Models

Sports
Best Male Coach: 
Fernando Santos - Football
Rui Vitória - Football
José Uva - Athletics
Hélio Lucas e José Sousa - Canoeing

Best Male Athlete: 
Cristiano Ronaldo - Football
Ricardinho - Futsal
Madjer - Beach Soccer
Fernando Pimenta - Canoeing

Best Female Athlete: 
Telma Monteiro - Judo
Patrícia Mamona - Athletics
Teresa Bonvalot - Surf
Tamila Holub - Swimming

Music

Best Individual Performer: 
Carminho - O Amor é Assim
António Zambujo - Até Pensei Que Fosse Minha
Cristina Branco - Menina
Fábia Rebórdão - Falem Agora

Best Group: 
Capitão Fausto - Morro Na Praia
Dead Combo - Dead Combo e as Cordas da Má Fama
HMB - O Amor é Assim
Deolinda - Outras Histórias

Best Song: 
"O Amor é Assim" - HMB feat. Carminho  
"Do You Know Wrong" - Richie Campbell 
"Amor Maior" - Paulo Gonzo e Raquel Tavares
"Era Eu" - D.A.M.A

Best Newcomer

Beatriz Frazão - Acting
April Ivy - Music
André Silva - Football
Renato Sanches - Football

Award of Merit and Excellence

Fernando Santos

References

Golden Globes (Portugal)
Golden Globes (Portugal)
Golden Globes (Portugal)
Golden Globes (Portugal)
Golden Globes
Golden Globes